The Midland Regional Hockey Association is the organising body for field hockey in the Midlands, England. It feeds teams into the Men's and Women's England Hockey Leagues and receives teams from regional and county leagues.

League structure

The region has separate men's league structures for 1st, 2nd and 3rd XIs, and an open Central League for 4th XIs and below. The champions of the Premier Division enter the Men's and Women's England Hockey League Conference play-offs.

The league covers the counties of Derbyshire, Leicestershire and Rutland, Northamptonshire, Nottinghamshire, Shropshire, Staffordshire, Warwickshire and Worcestershire.

Recent champions

Midlands Hockey League 1XI Premier Division

Midlands Women's Hockey League 1XI Premier Division

References

Field hockey governing bodies in England
Field hockey leagues in England
Sport in Birmingham, West Midlands
Sport in Derbyshire
Sport in Derby
Sport in Leicestershire
Sport in Leicester
Sport in Rutland
Sport in Northamptonshire
Sport in Northampton
Sport in Nottinghamshire
Sport in Nottingham
Sport in Shropshire
Sport in Staffordshire
Sport in Warwickshire
Sport in Worcestershire
Sport in Worcester, England